Miroslav Verner (born October 31, 1941 in Brno) is a Czech egyptologist, who specializes in the history and archaeology of Ancient Egypt of the Old Kingdom and especially of the Fifth Dynasty of Egypt.

Biography
Verner was the director of the Czechoslovak and later Czech Institute of Egyptology at the Faculty of Arts, Charles University in Prague for twenty-five years, and led the Czech excavations at Abusir. He has also been associated with the Universities of Vienna and Hamburg as well as the Charles University in Prague and the American University in Cairo.

Verner has been active in archaeological work since 1964, and he has been excavating at Abusir since 1976. In 1998, the tomb of Iufaa, an Egyptian priest and administer of palaces, was discovered in an undisturbed tomb by a team of Czech archaeologists from the Czech Institute of Egyptology, under the direction of Verner.

In 2005, Verner became the director of the project called "Investigation of the civilisation of Ancient Egypt". The project runs from 2005 to 2011, and the aim is to study the evolution of Egyptian society throughout its history.

Bibliography
Selected monographs include:
Abusir XII. Minor tombs in the Royal Necropolis I (The Mastabas of Nebtyemneferes and Nakhtsare, Pyramid Complex Lepsius no. 24 and Tomb Complex Lepsius no. 25) (with J. Krejčí and V.G. Callender), Prague 2008.
Unearthing Ancient Egypt: Fifty years of the Czech Archaeological Exploration in Egypt [Hardcover] (with Hana Benesovska); Czech Institute of Egyptology; December 31, 2008.
Abusir IX — The Pyramid Complex of Raneferef, the Archaeology (v. 9, Pt. 1) [Hardcover], Czech Institute of Egyptology Charles Univers; December 31, 2006.
Abusir X — The Pyramid Complex of Raneferef: The Papyrus Archive (Abusir Monographs) (v. 10) (with Paule Posener-Krieger and Hana Vymazalova) [Hardcover], Czech Institute of Egyptology; December 1, 2006.Abusir: The Realm of Osiris (Hardcover), American University in Cairo Press: 2003, 248 pagesThe Pyramids: The Mystery, Culture, and Science of Egypt's Great Monuments, Grove Press,  : October 2001, 432 pagesForgotten pharaohs, lost pyramids: Abusir, Academia Skodaexport; 1994.The mastaba of Ptahshepses (The Excavations of the Czechoslovak Institute of Egyptology at Abusir) , Charles University (1977)

Articles include:Contemporaneous Evidence for the Relative Chronology of Dyns. 4 and 5, in: E. Hornung – R. Krauss – D. A. Warburton (eds.), Ancient Egyptian Chronology, (HdO. Section 1. The Near and Middle East 83), Leiden – Boston 2006 [v tisku].The Abusir Pyramids Quarry and Supply Road, in: P. Jánosi (ed.), Structure and Significance. Thoughts on Ancient Egyptian Architecture, (DÖAW 33), Wien 2005, 531–538.Archaeological Remarks on the 4th and 5th Dynasty Chronology'', Archiv Orientální, Volume 69: 2001, pp. 363–418

References

External links

Miroslav Verner Website Page maintained by the Czech Institute of Egyptology. Background and bibliography are provided.
Interview with Miroslav Verner 

Czech archaeologists
Czech Egyptologists
1941 births
Living people
Recipients of Medal of Merit (Czech Republic)
Writers from Brno
Academic staff of Charles University